The Amur is a major river in Russia and China, forming part of the border between these countries.

Amur may also refer to:

Places
Amur, Altai Republic, a rural locality in Ust-Koksinsky District, the Altai Republic, Russia
Amur Oblast, a federal subject of Russia
Amur Bay, a body of water in Peter the Great Gulf
Amur State University, a university in Russia
Amur Liman, the estuary of the river
Amur Point, a point on the east shore of Moresby Island, British Columbia, Canada

Sports
Golden Amur, a defunct Russian ice hockey team
Amur Khabarovsk, a Russian ice hockey team

Transportation 
Amur-class motorship, a classification of passenger ships from Russia
Amur-class submarine, a classification of Russian submarine
Amur (launch vehicle), a partially-reusable Russian launch vehicle being designed in 2020 for first flight ~2026.

Organisms
Amur bitterling (Amur bitterling), a fish
Amur catfish (Silurus asotus), a fish
Amur falcon, ( Falco amurensis), a bird
Amur hedgehog (Erinaceus amurensis), a mammal
Amur lemming (Lemmus amurensis),  a mammal
Amur maple (Acer ginnala), a tree
Amur honeysuckle (Lonicera maackii), a shrub
Amur leopard (Panthera pardus orientalis), a leopard subspecies 
Amur peppervine (Ampelopsis glandulosa var. brevipedunculata), a plant
Amur privet (Ligustrum obtusifolium), a plant
Amur silver-grass (Miscanthus sacchariflorus), a plant
Amur sleeper (Perccottus glenii), a fish
Amur tiger (Panther tigris tigris), another name for a Siberian tiger
Amur viper (Gloydius saxatilis), a snake
Amur virus, an RNA virus
Amur wagtail (Motacilla alba leucopsis), a bird

People with the surname 
G. S. Amur, Indian writer
K. S. Amur, Indian mathematician

Other uses
Amur (company), former Russian manufacturing company
Amur, a tiger, part of the tiger-goat pair Amur and Timur in a Russian zoo

See also

Amursky (disambiguation)
Amursk
Amour (disambiguation)
Ammer (disambiguation)
Amurian Plate, a tectonic plate